Sayyid Waris Ali Mirza Khan Bahadur (14 November 1901 – 20 November 1969) was the last Nawab of Murshidabad before a prolonged interregnum caused by a succession dispute within the family that was only resolved in 2014 by the Indian Supreme Court. He succeeded his father, Wasif Ali Mirza.

Biography
Waris Ali was born on 14 November 1901 at Murshidabad as the eldest son of Wasif Ali Mirza by his first wife Sultan Dulhan Faghfur Jahan Begum Sahiba. Waris Ali's maternal grandfather was Wala Kadir Sayyid Husain Ali Mirza Bahadur.

Waris Ali ruled for ten years, from 1959 until his death on 20 November 1969 at Calcutta. Although he left three sons and three daughters, there was a long interregnum following his death because of succession dispute caused by his children's disinheritance for a variety of reasons.

In August 2014 the Indian Supreme Court ruled that Mohammed Abbas Ali Mirza, a nephew of Waris Ali Mirza, was the fourth Nawab of Murshidabad in August 2014.

Honours

The following are some of the honours received by Waris Ali Mirza:

 Page of Honour to Queen Empress Mary during her Imperial Tour of India with George V (1911–1912)
 Delhi Durbar Silver Medal (1911)
 King George V Silver Jubilee Medal (1935)
 King George VI Coronation Medal (1937)

Family

Wives

The following are the wives of Waris Ali Mirza, whom he married:

 'Zeenat un-Nisa Begum' Sahiba (née Moselle Meyer). She was Waris Ali's wife from August 1921 to 29 March 1932 (divorced). She was of Jewish origin, born in 1908 to Reuben Meyer and Flora. Zeenat un-Nisa Begum died at Harrow, Middlesex in 1968.
 'Wahid un-Nisa Begum Sahiba' (H.H. Nawab Begum of Murshidabad; née Muriel Frances Mchellan). She was born on 23 November 1905 at London.

Descendants

Waris Ali had three sons and three daughters as follows:

 Sayyid Wakif Ali Mirza Bahadur (Sunni Sahib) was born on 16 February 1923 at Calcutta. He was the son of Zeenat-un-nisa Begum. He was excluded from the succession by his father on 9 July 1963, for contracting a non-Muslim marriage and for not professing the Muslim religion (validity in law doubted by the Calcutta High Court on 6 November 1990). He took no steps during his lifetime to establish his succession but, being a foreign national, they were unlikely to be recognised by the Government of India. Wakif Ali married 'Zeb-un-nisa Begum Sahiba' (née Dina Lawyer) and 'Miriam Begum Sahiba' (née Margaret Evelyn Van Dort: younger daughter of Donald Stanley Van Dort by his wife, Sheila Pauline Constance, and the granddaughter of Walter William Charles Goddard). Wakif Ali died at Melbourne, Australia on 14 May 2008. He had one son and two daughters:

a. Sayyid Wahid Ali Walter Mirza (Walter Mirza). He was the son of 'Miriam Begum' and was born on 29 September 1961. He had a daughter:
i. Sahibzadi Vanessa Siobhan Begum (Vanessa Meerza). She was born on 19 July 1994 and died of cancer, at Melbourne, Australia on 18 May 2002.
b. Nargis Jahan Begum (b. 15 January 1947) (d/o 'Zeb-un-nisa Begum') and
c. Margaret Sheila Nadir Jahan Begum (b. 16 April 1959) (d/o 'Miriam Begum').

 Sayyid Waqir Ali Mirza (Chippu Sahib) (b. 1930) (s/o Zeenat-un-nisa Begum).

 Ranjit Kumar Ghosh (b. 1930) was the step son of Waris Ali and his second wife, Wahid-un-nisa Begum.

 Sahibzadi Nigar Ara Begum (b. 1924) (d/o Zeenat-un-nisa Begum)

 Sahibzadi Shajar Ara Begum (15 August 1926 – 27 December 2000). She was the daughter of Zeenat-un-nisa Begum. Shajar Ara Begum was educated in India, but she moved to London in 1961. She kept herself involved in several charities: fundraising for Marie Curie Cancer Care, UNICEF and Anti Slavery International. Shajar Ara Begum was the vice president of the English Speaking Unions for South East Asia and a member of the Royal Society of St. George and also of the European Atlantic. She was a patron of the ASHA Foundation, the Russian Orphans Organization and the Voice.

 Sahibzadi Zeb-un-nisa Begum (1928–22 March 2004) (d/o Zeenat-un-nisa Begum). She divorced her first husband and married a man named Muhammad Azam Khanzada (d. at Westminster, London in 2002). Zeb-un-nisa, too, died at Westminster, London, on 22 March 2004 and was buried at Carpenders Park Cemetery. She had a daughter by her first husband and a son by her second husband.

(Note: "" Denotes Waris Ali's children, "a, b, c..." Denotes Waris Ali's grandchildren and "i, ii, iii...." Denotes Waris Ali's great grandchildren.)

See also

 List of rulers of Bengal
 Nawabs of Bengal and Murshidabad
 History of Bengal
 History of Bangladesh
 History of India

References

External links
   Site dedicated to Waris Ali Mirza

1901 births
1969 deaths
20th-century Indian monarchs
Indian Shia Muslims
Nawabs of Murshidabad